The DPD Dutch Junior Open Squash 2018 is the men's edition of the 2018 Dutch Junior Open Squash, which is a World Junior Squash Circuit Tier 2 event. The event took place at the Frans Otten Stadion from July 12 to 15. The title stayed in English possession for the second straight year, with Lewis Anderson claiming his first Dutch Junior Open title after defeating the Spaniard Iván Pérez Saavedra 3-1 in the Boys' Under 19 final.

Seeds (Boys' Under 19)

Draw and results

Finals

Top half

Section 1

Section 2

Bottom half

Section 1

Section 2

See also
British Junior Open Squash 2018
French Junior Open Squash
2018 US Junior Open Squash Championships
World Junior Squash Championships
2019 Canadian Junior Open Squash

References

2018 in squash
Squash in the Netherlands
Squash tournaments in the Netherlands